Tsing Wun is one of the MTR Light Rail stops. It is located at ground level at Tsing Wun Road near Hong Kong Institute of Vocational Education (IVE) (Tuen Mun) in Tuen Mun District. It began service on 18 September 1988 and belongs to Zone 2. It serves IVE (Tuen Mun) and nearby industrial areas.

History
This stop was originally named "Lung Mun" as it is located at Lung Mun Road. Later, the section of Lung Mun Road near the stop was renamed to Ming Kum Road, so the stop was renamed to "Technical Institute" as it is next to Tuen Mun Technical Institute. The stop was renamed again to the current "Tsing Wun" in 2003 after Tuen Mun Technical Institute was renamed to Hong Kong Institute of Vocational Education (Tuen Mun) in 1999.

References

MTR Light Rail stops
Former Kowloon–Canton Railway stations
Tuen Mun District
Railway stations in Hong Kong opened in 1988